Ahli Shirazi (Persian: اهلی شیرازی ), full name Muhammad ibn Yusuf Ahli Shirazi, was a Persian poet who lived in Shiraz, Iran from 858 to 942H (circa 1454-1535). He is buried in Hafezieh.

It is said that his life style was retiring, he faced poverty, and his life was filled with struggle.

Ahli Shirazi excelled especially in elaborately ingenious word plays and other rhetorical devices. His works include ghazals, qasidas, robais (quatrains), and other types. One ornamental ode imitates a famous rhetorical piece by Salman Savaji and was judged more successful than Salman's original; but Lotf Ali Beg commented that such rhetorical devices are not the stuff of which true poetry is made. Of Ahli's masnavis an allegory on love entitled  (completed in 1489) is interesting for its treatment not only of the standard suffering of the lover (moth), but also of the affection that the beloved (candle) develops for the suffering lover, only for the two to be parted by "cruel fate" through the agency of the wind.

References

Sources

External links
 Manuscript of his works available on the digital library website of the Iran Parliament Library.

Browne, E. G. A Literary History of Persia, IV 233.

15th-century Persian-language poets
16th-century Persian-language poets
1454 births
1535 deaths
Poets of the Aq Qoyunlu
16th-century writers of Safavid Iran